West Baratang Group are an island group of the Andaman Islands, located west of Baratang Island.

Administration
Politically, the Baratang Islands, are part of Rangat Taluk. The islands are also known as Port Anson Islands.

Fauna
Parrot island is a famous tourist spot.
It is a small uninhabited island located near Baratang Jetty. What makes it attractive for tourists is the mystery that this island holds which calls thousands of parrots every evening.

References 

 Geological Survey of India

Archipelagoes of the Andaman and Nicobar Islands
North and Middle Andaman district
Uninhabited islands of India